The Guardian 100 Best Male Footballers in the World is a list of the greatest male footballers published annually by the British newspaper The Guardian. From its inception to 2017, it was known as ''The Guardian'' 100 Best Footballers in the World. It is decided by a panel of experts from several nations.

Winners

Wins by player

See also 
 The Guardian Footballer of the Year
 World Soccer Player of the Year
 Onze Mondial European Footballer of the Year
 FourFourTwo Player of the Year Award
 El País King of European Soccer
 ESM Team of the Season

References 

The Guardian awards
Association football-related lists
Association football trophies and awards